"Just Another Case" is the debut single by American hip hop group Cru. It was released as the lead single from their debut album, Da Dirty 30 (1997). It was produced by the group's producer, Yogi, and featured a verse from Slick Rick, whose song "Children's Story" was sampled. "Just Another Case" found mild success on the Billboard charts, making it to 68 on the Billboard Hot 100 and number 8 on the Hot Rap Singles.

Single track listing

A-Side
"Just Another Case" (Radio Edit)   
"Just Another Case" (Instrumental)

B-Side
"Just Another Case" (Remix Radio)   
"Just Another Case" (Remix Instrumental)   
"Pronto" (LP Version)

Charts

References

1997 debut singles
Slick Rick songs
1997 songs
Def Jam Recordings singles
Songs written by Slick Rick